Border Treasure is a 1950 American western film directed by George Archainbaud. from RKO Pictures.

Plot
Tim Holt and his pal, Chito Rafferty, thwart outlaws' plans to steal a treasure that has been donated to help earthquake victims in Mexico.

Cast
Tim Holt as himself.
Richard Martin as Chito Rafferty

References

External list

1950 films
American Western (genre) films
1950 Western (genre) films
RKO Pictures films
American black-and-white films
Films directed by George Archainbaud
1950s English-language films
1950s American films